Thomas Enqvist was the defending champion but did not compete that year.

Tim Henman won in the final 6–3, 6–4, 6–2 against Roger Federer.

Seeds
A champion seed is indicated in bold text while text in italics indicates the round in which that seed was eliminated.

  Gustavo Kuerten (first round)
  Tim Henman (champion)
  Àlex Corretja (first round)
  Roger Federer (final)
  Arnaud Clément (second round)
  Andy Roddick (quarterfinals)
  Carlos Moyá (semifinals)
  Jan-Michael Gambill (first round)

Draw

 NB: The final was the best of 5 sets while all other rounds were the best of 3 sets.

Final

Section 1

Section 2

External links
 2001 Davidoff Swiss Indoors Draw

2001 ATP Tour
2001 Davidoff Swiss Indoors